The , S.A. (General Tobacco Company of the Philippines, abbreviated CdF), also known as the , was a Spanish multinational joint-stock company, one of the world's most important enterprises in the late 19th and early 20th century, and the Philippines' first private tobacco company.

Although the company today specializes in tobacco trading, over the years the company also ran a shipping line and established factories with the aim of cultivating, trading, manufacturing, and commercializing tobacco from the Philippines.  It also expanded its interests beyond tobacco, engaging in the exploitation of sugar and alcohol distribution, copra, abacá and maguey, as well as owning significant interests in electricity generation, transport and insurance.

In 2007, it merged with the Dutch tobacco trading company Lippoel Leaf, forming the CdF International Group, and in 2011, CdF merged again with the American tobacco trading company Hail & Cotton,  with the company itself continuing to exist as its Philippine subsidiary.

Activities
Production and sale of tobacco products.
Running an ocean line for the transport of merchandise and passengers.
Commercializing forest products beginning in 1892.
Production and sale of sugar and alcohol beginning in 1893.
Production of copra.
Production of  fibre, also known as 'Manila hemp'.
Production of  fibre.

Markets
Regarding distribution, the company operated in three markets:
Spanish market (Peninsular).
European market, trading with countries like United Kingdom, Germany, the Netherlands, and Portugal.
Philippines, the rest of Asia and Oceania.

Credits
The National Historical Institute issued a marker along Romualdez St. in Ermita, Manila in 1951. The marker commends the company for the important role it played in the economic development in the Philippines and for the company's fair treatment of its workers. It also notes that the reconstruction of its central office after World War II symbolizes the reemergence of the company as a key player in the country's progress. The  is credited to have organized the largest Filipiniana collection that the Philippine Government has acquired.

See also
1929 Barcelona International Exposition
Compañía Transatlántica Española
Compañía General de Tabacos de Filipinas v. Collector of Internal Revenue

References

Further reading

External links 
 
 

Tobacco companies of the Philippines
Companies based in Manila
Companies established in 1881
1881 establishments in Spain
Shipping companies of Spain